The Mirror Lake Historic District encompasses Mirror Lake, a man-made lake in the Ozark-St. Francis National Forest near Fifty-Six, Arkansas.  The lake was created by a crew of the Civilian Conservation Corps in 1940 by damming the creek emanating from Blanchard Spring.  The district includes the lake, the dam, and two bridges, one of which was also built by the CCC, and a CCC-built observation shelter nearby.  The area is now part of the Blanchard Springs Recreation Area.

The district was listed on the National Register of Historic Places in 1995.

See also

National Register of Historic Places listings in Stone County, Arkansas

References

Historic districts on the National Register of Historic Places in Arkansas
Buildings and structures completed in 1940
Buildings and structures in Stone County, Arkansas
Ozark–St. Francis National Forest
National Register of Historic Places in Stone County, Arkansas